Hurricane Olaf was a minimal hurricane that impacted Mexico in October 2003. The fifteenth named storm and sixth hurricane of the annual season, Olaf formed from a tropical wave became better organized on October 2 to the south-southeast of Acapulco and developed into a depression the next day. It strengthened into Tropical Storm Olaf six hours after forming. Continued intensification occurred, and Olaf reached its peak strength as a Category 1 hurricane with 75 mph (120 km/h) winds on October 5 and developed a partial eyewall. The storm soon became disorganized and was only a hurricane for six hours, before re-curving towards the Mexican coast. The cyclone made landfall near Manzanillo, Colima, on October 7 and soon dissipated overland. The storm caused severe flooding in the states of Jalisco and Guanajuato. However, no fatalities were reported.

Meteorological history

Olaf originated from a tropical wave that exited the coast of Africa on September 17. Over the next two weeks, it moved westbound into the northeastern Pacific Ocean. Initially, the wave was not in an environment conductive for further development. However, on October 2, a low-level circulation was noted on satellite imagery. This circulation quickly became better defined over the next several hours while located 400 mi (645 km) south of Acapulco. The next day, Dvorak Classifications, a tool that estimates a tropical cyclone intensity, were placed at T1.5/30 mph (50 km/h). In addition, a ship nearby reported winds of 35 mph (45 km/h). Microwave imagery also indicated that the center was near the associated convection. Based on this, the system was upgraded into a tropical depression.

Initially, wind shear from nearby Tropical Storm Nora was expected to weaken the system but this did not occur. , the depression was soon upgraded into a tropical storm. Moving northwest, it steadily intensified into a moderate tropical storm late on October 3. The next day, Olaf weakened slightly, only to resume intensification roughly 24 hours later. At that time, it was noted that additional intensification was likely. On October 5, radar imagery indicated a partial eyewall. Based on this, Olaf was upgraded into a minimal hurricane. At the same time, reached it peak intensity at 75 mph (120 km/h) and a barometric pressure of 987 millibars. Olaf was hurricane for only six hours, but operationally it was believed had been a hurricane for much longer. This is Because that the center was operationally believed to be further north, closer to the deep convection, Olaf was operationally believed to have been a hurricane for much longer.

Shortly after reaching its peak, Olaf began to become less organized, resulting in steady weakening while the storm's motion slowed. By early October 6, Olaf was only a minimal tropical storm as the system recurved northwest. However, Olaf rapidly reorganized that afternoon and the National Hurricane Center re-assessed the intensity at 50 mph (80 km/h) based on increased banding features. Continued restrengthening occurred, and by October 8, Olaf made landfall with winds of 60 mph (97 km/h) near Manzanillo. Olaf weakened rapidly over the high terrain of the coast. Within 24 hours, Olaf had dissipated inland.

Preparations and impact

While Olaf was at peak strength, a tropical storm warning issued for Punta San Telmo to Lazaro Cardenas and a hurricane warning was issued from Punta San Telmo to San Blas, including the Islas Marias. The next day, the tropical storm warning was extended to include Manzanillo. At that same time, a hurricane watch was issued from San Blas to Mazatlán. In addition, hurricane warning was extended to include areas from Manzanillo to San Blas including the Islas Marias. Three hours later, when Olaf was revealed to be much weaker, the hurricane warnings and hurricane watches were canceled. However, the tropical storm warnings remained in effect until October 7. A yellow alert was declared in the Mexican states of Michoacán, Colima, and Jalisco, and a green alert was declared in Baja California Sur, Sinaloa, Nayarit, and Guerrero. Local authorities also opened shelters.

Olaf was a part of a rainy year in Mexico, producing more rain than Hurricane Nora. One person was killed, and flooding caused serve damage to roadways and crops in the Mexican state of Jalisco. In the same state, more than 12,000 homes were damaged. In the state of Guanajuato, an estimated total of 15,000 people were impacted from the floods. In addition, two communities were isolated. After the hurricane, a program wanted donation from food to basic home supplies. Moisture from the remnants of Nora and Olaf interacted with an upper-level low to produce heavy rainfall across Texas, producing flooding near Waco that forced a family to evacuate in McGregor. The floodwaters closed portions of Interstate 35, U.S. Route 84, and Texas State Highway 36. It also spawned a tornado in Sugar Land that damaged four buildings, including a school.

See also 

Other storms of the same name

References 

Olaf
Olaf (2003)
Olaf
Hurricanes in Guanajuato
Hurricanes in Jalisco
Hurricanes in Texas
Hurricanes in Michoacán
Hurricanes in Colima
Hurricanes in Nayarit